Tweety's S.O.S. is a  1951 Warner Bros. Merrie Melodies cartoon directed by Friz Freleng. The short was released on September 22, 1951, and stars Tweety and Sylvester.

Plot

The story opens with Sylvester patiently rummaging through trash cans for food. When he realizes how distasteful the bits are that he is finding, he despondently wanders down to the shipyard and sits by a docked cruise ship. The ship moves up and down with the current and, as the cat ponders things, he becomes aware of a porthole through which can be seen Tweety swinging in his cage. Sylvester grasps the edge of the porthole, opens the window and says, "Hello breakfast". Tweety slams it shut, causing Sylvester to drop into the water. Sylvester climbs back to the dock and smacks the lobster off on his tail

Managing to get aboard, Sylvester enters Tweety's cabin and grabs him, mid-chirp. As he heads out the door, Granny is standing there, demanding to know what he is doing with "my little birdie". Sylvester chuckles nervously, patting Tweety's head as if he is fond of him. Tweety says, "Ooh, what a hypotwit". Granny chases the cat, hitting him with her  umbrella, and calling him various things, including hooligan and devil. Granny's glasses fall off and, though they are near her on the floor, she cannot see them, and she cannot see anything without them.  Sylvester kicks them under the couch and begins pursuing Tweety around the cabin. Tweety runs under the couch and retrieves the glasses; he is able to get them back on Granny just as Sylvester is leaping at the bird. She swipes at him with the umbrella, misses, but catches him in the head after she throws it at him when he runs from the ship.

The ship sets sail; Granny and Tweety wave and call goodbye to the crowd on shore. Sylvester, stowed away on a lifeboat with the number 13 on it, waves farewell with a white handkerchief.

Soon, Tweety and Granny are taking naps on deck. Sylvester takes Granny's glasses and paints a likeness of the bird on one lens.  He opens the cage door and takes Tweety, who flies up calling out "Help!". Awakened, Granny puts the glasses on and, looking at the cage, is fooled into thinking Tweety is there. Sylvester follows Tweety onto high wires; the bird gets safely across while the cat is struggling with his footing. Tweety springs the wire so Sylvester falls, able to hang on to one wire with one paw. As he is sweating with fear, the bird starts doing an "Eeny, Meeny, Miny, Moe" while pulling each 'finger' from the wire. Because the cat has only three, Tweety only reaches 'Miny' before Sylvester falls into the water.  Tweety says, "Well, what do you know? No Moe".

Rough seas eventually make Sylvester seasick. When Tweety sees Sylvester's literally green face, he laughs and offers him something for his tummy: a nice piece of salt pork. Sylvester turns a variety of colors and becomes even sicker; he dashes to the medical room to get some seasick remedy. After he downs this, he is instantly better and chases Tweety, who leads the cat below deck and tricks him into running into the furnace. The fire and heat results in Sylvester being ejected through the smokestack screaming in agony.

After he climbs back aboard and sees Tweety, Tweety shows Sylvester a picture of a boat on the water. He moves it back and forth, while narrating:  "It was a tewwible torm. Da boat wocked and wocked. Up one wave and down anudder, wocking da boat. Wocking. Wocking..." This nauseates Sylvester, who runs again to the medical room for more seasick remedy. Tweety gets there first and fills the bottle with nitroglycerin. Sylvester drinks it and seemingly realizes something is not right about the liquid.  He spits and creates a small explosive spark. Now he chases Tweety, using his spit as a weapon. As they round a corner, Granny is waiting, umbrella in hand; she begins striking at Sylvester but keeps missing.  Tweety tries to tell Granny to stop: "No, no, no, no!  Don't hit 'im, Dwanny!  You'll be towwy!". Despite Tweety's warnings, Granny finally manages to hit Sylvester, and thus sets off the nitroglycerin he drank.

The ensuing loud explosion leaves Granny frazzled with a look of "Now he tells me" on her face and Sylvester launched up like a rocket. In the open sky, there is a flash of a firework with a cascade of white sparks before the cat falls back down. The captain, watching through binoculars, uses Tweety's catch phrase: "I tawt I taw a puddy tat!". Sylvester lands on the captain, leaving both looking pretty battered and bruised. Granny, who is now steering the ship, and Tweety reply, "You did, you did tee a puddy tat!". Granny dons the headgear of an admiral, and Tweety a sailor's cap, and takes over steering the ship for the dazed captain.

References

External links

 

1951 short films
1951 animated films
American comedy short films
Seafaring films
Merrie Melodies short films
Sylvester the Cat films
Tweety films
Animated films about birds
Films set on ships
Short films directed by Friz Freleng
Films scored by Carl Stalling
Warner Bros. Cartoons animated short films
1950s Warner Bros. animated short films
1950s English-language films
American animated short films
Animated films about cats
Films about old age